Sharks!  is an art installation in London, England by architect Jaimie Shorten. The art was built following its concept winning the 2020 Antepavilion, an annual art contest.

Art 
Sharks! consists of five life-sized fibreglass model sharks. The project was inspired by The Headington Shark in Oxford. The installation cost £25,000. It was selected and built as the 2020 Antepavilion, fitting the year's theme of "tension of authoritarian governance of the built environment and aesthetic libertarianism". Shorten said that he thinks of the sharks as ingénues, that have surfaced in the "centre of hipster maelstrom" and as "dumb recipients of the horrible world" that are redeemed through being in Hoxton and "being together".

Dispute 
In August 2020,  Hackney London Borough Council obtained an interim injunction order to prohibit the Sharks! from being installed at the Regent's Canal in Hoxton. As stated in the interim injunction order, the Order was made at a hearing without notice to the Defendants.

In October 2020, Hackney London Borough Council obtained a varied interim High Court injunction order to remove Sharks! from Regent's Canal in Hoxton after a reconsideration hearing.

In April 2021, Sharks! was relocated to Islington Boat Club.

In June 2021, the sharks were removed from their home in the Islington Boat Club and returned to Antepavilion where they were stored on a river barge.

In July 2021, the Court of Appeal granted permission to appeal the injunction order.

See also
 The Headington Shark

References

External links 

 London Borough of Hackney v Shiva Ltd & Ors [2020] EWHC 2489 (QB) judgment on BAILII

 

Outdoor sculptures in England
Sharks in art
Fiberglass sculptures in the United Kingdom
2020 sculptures
2020 establishments in England